The Encyclopaedia of Forms and Precedents is a large collection of non-litigious  legal forms and precedents published by LexisNexis UK.

The encyclopaedia is available in hard copy, on a searchable online database, and on CD-ROM. It currently consists of 90+ volumes which are subject to constant alteration, as volumes are regularly revised and reissued to reflect changes in the law. Subscribers are provided with frequent updates in the form of modifications to the online database, and a quarterly looseleaf service.

The encyclopaedia is most often subscribed to and utilised by legal practices and academic institutions.

The First Edition was published in 17 volumes from 1902 to 1910. The Second Edition was published in 20 volumes in 1925. The Third Edition was published in 20 volumes from 1946 to 1951.

References

See also
Halsbury's Laws of England
Halsbury's Statutes
LexisNexis Butterworths

Law books
Legal literature
Legal research
English law
Encyclopedias of law